The Moraga Formation or Moraga Volcanics is a Pliocene epoch volcanic geologic formation in the Berkeley Hills of the East Bay region of the San Francisco Bay Area, California.

The basaltic lava flow formation is found within Alameda County and Contra Costa County. It can be seen in the Robert Sibley Volcanic Regional Preserve and Caldecott Tunnel area of the Berkeley Hills.  It is named for an exposed occurrence in the Moraga Valley.

It overlies the Orinda Formation, and underlies the Siesta Formation of Great Valley Group.

Fossils
It preserves freshwater fossils dating back to the Pliocene epoch of the Neogene period.

See also

 Mulholland Formation — occurs to the south, in the Berkeley and San Leandro Hills.
 
 List of fossiliferous stratigraphic units in California
 Paleontology in California

References

External links
East Bay Regional Parks.org: official  Robert Sibley Volcanic Regional Preserve website
EBparks.org: Volcanism at Sibley Volcanic Preserve

Berkeley Hills
Pliocene California
Geologic formations of California
Geology of Alameda County, California
Geology of Contra Costa County, California
Natural history of the California Coast Ranges
Natural history of the San Francisco Bay Area
Volcanism of California
Pliocene Series of North America
Pliocene volcanism